The Philadelphia Phillies' 2011 season was the 129th season in the history of the franchise. The Phillies won their fifth consecutive National League East championship, and also finished with the best record in baseball for the second straight year. The Phillies, at 3–1 odds, were the heavy-favorite to win the World Series. However, they were eliminated in the first round of the playoffs in five games to the eventual World Series champion St. Louis Cardinals. This was the last season that the Phillies made the postseason until 2022, making it the longest active postseason drought in the National League at the time. The 2011 Phillies were the last team until the 2015 Cardinals to finish the season with at least 100 wins.

Offseason
The offseason for the Phillies began on October 23, 2010, when they lost the National League Championship Series to the San Francisco Giants. Although all coaches were invited to return for the 2011 season, first-base coach Davey Lopes informed the team that he would be leaving because of a salary dispute. To replace him, third-base coach Sam Perlozzo was moved to first base, and former Phillies second baseman and Orioles' third-base coach and interim manager Juan Samuel was hired to take over at third base.

On November 16, the Phillies signed reliever José Contreras to a two-year contract after he posted a 3.34 ERA in 2010. On December 6, right fielder Jayson Werth signed a seven-year contract with the Washington Nationals. On December 15, the Phillies re-signed Cliff Lee, the starting pitcher whom they had traded to the Seattle Mariners during the previous offseason in order to acquire Roy Halladay. With the addition of Lee, Halladay, Cole Hamels, and Roy Oswalt earned the nickname "The Four Aces".

Regular season

April
The Phillies stormed out of the gate, sweeping the Houston Astros on opening weekend. Three out of the four aces won their first starts (Hamels lost against the Mets). José Contreras was said to be the new Phillies closer; however, he got injured in late April, and was replaced by Ryan Madson. Madson continued the year in the closer position. The Phillies finished April with an 18–8 record, the second best in the majors, trailing only the Cleveland Indians, a team whom they traded with throughout the month for the best record in the majors.

May
On May 9, the Phillies took sole possession of the best record in the majors, a position that they would hold for the rest of the regular season. May was their second-worst month record-wise (following September)—they did not have many winning or losing streaks. However, the Phillies' game against rival New York Mets on May 1 was an unforgettable one, although they lost 2–1 in 14 innings. The Mets' Daniel Murphy was batting as a pinch-hitter against Phillies' reliever Ryan Madson when the fans started chanting "U-S-A!" Later, it was determined that the chants were in response to the news that al-Qaeda leader Osama bin Laden, the mastermind of the September 11 attacks, had been killed by United States special operations forces in Abbottabad, Pakistan. Mike Lopresti of USA Today said that the Phillies' rivals "was a perfect fit" when the news broke. The Phillies finished May with a 34–22 record.

June
June was a very good month for the Phillies. In the middle of the month, they went on a seven-game winning streak, taking three of four from the Chicago Cubs, and a four-game sweep of the Florida Marlins. They came back to earth, trading several wins and losses over the next week. June concluded with the marquee match-up against the Boston Red Sox, a series many predicted to be a World Series preview (as it turned out, neither team made the Fall Classic). The Phillies dominated, taking two of three, highlighted by Cliff Lee's shutout performance in the first game of the series. Lee went 5–0 with a 0.21 ERA in June, which earned him NL Pitcher of the Month. In June, Lee had more RBIs than earned runs (2 RBIs and only 1 earned run). The Phillies finished June with a 52–31 record.

July
By the beginning of July, the Phillies were certainly living up to their preseason hype, and were looking to be a definite contender for the World Series. July was the best month for the Phillies; they compiled a 17–8 record, and were beginning to run away with the NL East. On July 11, the Phillies overtook the top spot on ESPN's Power Rankings, a spot they would hold for the remaining 12 weeks of the season. The Phillies sent five players (Roy Halladay, Cliff Lee, Cole Hamels, Plácido Polanco, and Shane Victorino) to the All Star Game. The Phillies finished July with a 69–39 record.

August
The Phillies began August riding a nine-game winning streak, and in time, extended their lead in the NL East to 8.5 games. After several months of being injured, Roy Oswalt came back into action in the Phillies, winning his first two starts by a combined score of 16–3. Because of Hurricane Irene, the Phillies had to play 33 games in 31 days, from August 29 to September 28. Along the way, they played three doubleheaders, the last of which came as a result of a rain-out in September. On August 31, the Phillies reached 40 games over .500—for the first time since their back-to-back 100+ win seasons in 1976 and 1977, in which they went 101–61—with a 3–0 win in Cincinnati against the Reds and improved to 86–46. Wins during the next two days got them to 42 games over .500 for the first time in franchise history.

September
On September 14, the Phillies became the first team to clinch a playoff spot with a 1–0 win in Houston, against Hunter Pence's former team, after acquiring him at the trade deadline. Three days later, they clinched the NL East title for the fifth consecutive season. With 102 wins, the Phillies had the best record in baseball for the second year in a row and broke the franchise record for most regular-season wins. Towards the end of the season, the Phillies had an eight-game losing streak, but even with this streak, they had already clinched the NL East, as well as the best record in the majors. The Phillies ended the season by sweeping the Braves, capped off by a 14-inning win in the last game of the season. By winning the final game of the regular season, Phillies Manager Charlie Manuel also became the manager with the most wins in Phillies history. The win by the Phillies also eliminated the Braves from postseason contention, and allowed the St. Louis Cardinals to play in the postseason.

The Phillies also led the major leagues in attendance for the first time, with 3,680,718 fans (a franchise record), an average of 45,440 per game.

Standings

Record vs. opponents

Game log

|- bgcolor="#bbffbb"
| 1 || April 1 || Astros || 5–4 || Báez (1–0) || Lyon (0–1) || || 45,237 || 1–0
|- bgcolor="#bbffbb"
| 2 || April 2 || Astros || 9–4 || Lee (1–0) || Rodríguez (0–1) || || 45,455 || 2–0
|- bgcolor="#bbffbb"
| 3 || April 3 || Astros || 7–3 || Oswalt (1–0) || Norris (0–1) || || 45,562 || 3–0
|- bgcolor="#ffbbbb"
| 4 || April 5 || Mets || 1–7 || Young (1–0) || Hamels (0–1) || || 45,365 || 3–1
|- bgcolor="#bbffbb"
| 5 || April 6 || Mets || 10–7 || Bastardo (1–0) || Boyer (0–1) || Contreras (1) || 45,061 || 4–1
|- bgcolor="#bbffbb"
| 6 || April 7 || Mets || 11–0 || Halladay (1–0) || Niese (0–1) || || 45,468 || 5–1
|- bgcolor="#ffbbbb"
| 7 || April 8 || @ Braves || 3–6 || Hudson (2–0) || Lee (1–1) || Kimbrel (3) || 51,331 || 5–2
|- bgcolor="#bbffbb"
| 8 || April 9 || @ Braves || 10–2 || Oswalt (2–0) || Beachy (0–1) || || 36,256 || 6–2
|- bgcolor="#bbffbb"
| 9 || April 10 || @ Braves || 3–0 || Hamels (1–1) || Lowe (2–1) || Contreras (2) || 43,796 || 7–2
|- bgcolor="#ffbbbb"
| 10 || April 12 || @ Nationals || 4–7 || Hernández (1–1) || Blanton (0–1) || Burnett (3) || 13,413 || 7–3
|- bgcolor="#bbffbb" 
| 11 || April 13 || @ Nationals || 3–2 || Halladay (2–0) || Lannan (1–1) || || 16,914 || 8–3
|- bgcolor="#bbffbb"
| 12 || April 14 || @ Nationals || 4–0 || Lee (2–1) || Zimmermann (1–2) || || 24,875 || 9–3
|- bgcolor="#ffbbbb"
| 13 || April 15 || Marlins || 3–4 || Mujica (2–1) || Báez (1–1)||Núñez (5) || 45,667 ||  9–4
|- bgcolor="#bbbbbb"
|  || April 16 || Marlins || colspan=6| Postponed (rain); 
|- bgcolor="#bbffbb"
| 14 || April 17 || Marlins || 3–2 || Madson (1–0) || Webb (0–2) || Contreras (3) || 45,716 || 10–4
|- bgcolor="#ffbbbb"
| 15 || April 18 || Brewers || 3–6  || Kintzler (1–0) || Kendrick (0–1) || || 45,637 || 10–5
|- bgcolor="#ffbbbb"
| 16 || April 19 || Brewers || 0–9 || Wolf (2–2) || Halladay (2–1) || || 45,408 || 10–6
|- bgcolor="#bbffbb"
| 17 || April 20 || Brewers || 4–3 || Madson (2–0) || Kintzler (1–1) || Contreras (4) || 45,743 || 11–6
|- bgcolor="#bbffbb"
| 18 || April 21 || @ Padres || 3–0 || Oswalt (3–0) || Latos (0–3) || Contreras (5) || 27,056 || 12–6
|- bgcolor="#bbffbb"
| 19 || April 22 || @ Padres || 2–0 || Hamels (2–1) || Richard (1–1) || Madson (1) || 33,572 || 13–6
|- bgcolor="#bbffbb"
| 20 || April 23 || @ Padres || 4–2  || Kendrick (1–1) || Qualls (0–2) || Madson (2) || 40,038 || 14–6
|- bgcolor="#bbffbb"
| 21 || April 24 || @ Padres || 3–1 || Halladay (3–1) || LeBlanc (0–1) || Bastardo (1) || 24,031 || 15–6
|- bgcolor="#ffbbbb"
| 22 || April 25 || @ Diamondbacks || 0–4 || Kennedy (3–1) || Lee (2–2) || || 19,586 || 15–7
|- bgcolor="#ffbbbb"
| 23 || April 26 || @ Diamondbacks || 5–7 || Hudson (1–4) || Oswalt (3–1) || || 19,037 || 15–8
|- bgcolor="#bbffbb"
| 24 || April 27 || @ Diamondbacks || 8–4 || Hamels (3–1) || Saunders (0–3) || || 21,825 || 16–8
|- bgcolor="#bbffbb"
| 25 || April 29 || Mets || 10–3 || Worley (1–0) || Pelfrey (1–3) || || 45,613 || 17–8
|- bgcolor="#bbffbb"
| 26 || April 30 || Mets || 2–1 || Halladay (4–1) || Niese (1–4) || || 45,598 || 18–8

|- bgcolor="ffbbbb"
| 27 || May 1 || Mets || 1–2 || Buchholz (1–0)  || Kendrick (1–2) || || 45,713 || 18–9
|- bgcolor="#bbffbb"
| 28 || May 3 || Nationals || 4–1 || Hamels (4–1) || Hernández (3–3) || || 45,695 || 19–9
|- bgcolor="#bbffbb"
| 29 || May 4 || Nationals || 7–4 || Worley (2–0) || Marquis (3–1) || || 44,123 || 20–9
|- bgcolor="#bbffbb"
| 30 || May 5 || Nationals || 7–3 || Halladay (5–1) || Lannan (2–4) || || 45,316 || 21–9
|- bgcolor=ffbbbb
| 31 || May 6 || Braves || 0–5 || Lowe (3–3) || Lee (2–3) || || 45,495 || 21–10
|- bgcolor="#bbffbb"
| 32 || May 7 || Braves || 3–0 || Kendrick (2–2) || Teherán (0–1) || Madson (3) || 45,609 || 22–10
|- bgcolor=ffbbbb
| 33 || May 8 || Braves || 2–5 || Jurrjens (4–0) || Hamels (4–2) || Kimbrel (8) || 45,619 || 22–11
|- bgcolor="#bbffbb"
| 34 || May 9 || @ Marlins || 6–4 || Blanton (1–1) || Vázquez (2–3) ||Madson (4) || 11,444 || 23–11
|- bgcolor="#ffbbbb"
| 35 || May 10 || @ Marlins || 1–2 || Dunn (3–2) || Halladay (5–2) || Núñez (12) || 21,955 || 23–12
|- bgcolor="#bbffbb"
| 36 || May 11 || @ Marlins || 5–3 || Kendrick (3–2) || Núñez (0–1) || Madson (5) || 18.504 || 24–12
|- bgcolor="#bbffbb"
| 37 || May 13 || @ Braves || 5–4 || Bastardo (2–0) || Flaherty (1–2) || Madson (6) || 36,168 || 25–12
|- bgcolor="#ffbbbb"
| 38 || May 14 || @ Braves || 3–5 || Jurrjens (5–0) || Blanton (1–2) || Kimbrel (9) || 35,238 || 25–13
|- bgcolor="#ffbbbb"
| 39 || May 15 || @ Braves || 2–3 || Venters (5–3) || Halladay (5–3) ||Kimbrel (10) || 42,117 || 25–14
|- bgcolor="#ffbbbb"
| 40 || May 16 || @ Cardinals || 1–3 || Westbrook (3–3) || Lee (2–4) || Salas (4) || 34,884 || 25–15
|- bgcolor="#ffbbbb"
| 41 || May 17 || @ Cardinals || 1–2 || Salas (2–0) || Báez (1–2) || || 34,567 || 25–16
|- bgcolor="#bbffbb"
| 42 || May 18 || Rockies || 2–1 || Hamels (5–3) || Rosa (5–2) || Madson (7) || 44,665 || 26–16
|- bgcolor="#ffbbbb"
| 43 || May 19 || Rockies || 1–7 || Chacín (5–2) || Kendrick (3–3) || || 45,425 || 26–17
|- bgcolor="#bbffbb"
| 44 || May 20 || Rangers || 3–2 || Halladay (6–3) || Wilson (4–3) || Madson (8) || 45,358 || 27–17
|- bgcolor="#bbffbb"
| 45 || May 21 || Rangers || 2–0 || Lee (3–4) || Lewis (4–5) || Madson (9) || 45,604 || 28–17
|- bgcolor="#ffbbbb"
| 46 || May 22 || Rangers || 0–2 || Harrison (4–4) || Oswalt (3–2) || Feliz (9) || 45,633 || 28–18
|- bgcolor="#bbffbb"
| 47 || May 23 || Reds || 10–3 || Hamels (6–2) || Arroyo (3–5) || || 45,841 || 29–18
|- bgcolor="#ffbbbb"
| 48 || May 24 || Reds || 3–6 || Ondrusek (3–2) || Madson (2–1) || Cordero (9) || 45,740 || 29–19
|- bgcolor="#bbffbb"
| 49 || May 25 || Reds || 5–4  || Valdez (1–0) || Fisher (0–1) || || 45,706 || 30–19
|- bgcolor="#bbffbb"
| 50 || May 26 || Reds || 10–4 || Lee (4–4) || Thompson (0–1) || || 45,650 || 31–19
|- bgcolor="#bbffbb" 
|| 51 || May 27 || @ Mets || 6–4 || Bastardo (3–0) || Rodríguez (1–1) || Madson (10) || 33,882 || 32–19
|- bgcolor="#bbffbb" 
| 52 || May 28 || @ Mets || 5–2 || Hamels (6–2) || O'Connor (0–1) ||  Madson (11) || 29,337 || 33–19
|- bgcolor="#ffbbbb"
| 53 || May 29 || @ Mets || 5–9 || Niese (4–5) || Worley (2–1) || || 30,791 || 33–20
|- bgcolor="#bbffbb"
| 54 || May 30 || @ Nationals || 5–4 || Halladay (7–3) || Burnett (0–2) || Madson (12) || 34,789 || 34–20
|- bgcolor="#ffbbbb"
| 55 || May 31 || @ Nationals || 2–10 || Marquis (6–2) || Lee (4–5) || || 21,017 || 34–21

|- bgcolor="#ffbbbb"
| 56 || June 1 || @ Nationals || 1–2 || Lannan (3–5) || Oswalt (3–3) || Storen (10) || 24,495 || 34–22
|- bgcolor="#ffbbbb"
| 57 || June 3 || @ Pirates || 1–2 || Moskos (1–0) || Báez (1–3) || || 33,861 || 34–23
|- bgcolor="#ffbbbb"
| 58 || June 4 || @ Pirates || 3–6 || Morton (6–2) || Kendrick (3–4) || || 39,441 || 34–24
|- bgcolor="#bbffbb"
| 59 || June 5 || @ Pirates || 7–3 || Halladay (8–3) || McDonald (3–4) || || 35,505 || 35–24
|- bgcolor="#bbffbb"
| 60 || June 6 || Dodgers || 3–1 || Lee (5–5) || Lilly (4–5) || Madson (13) || 45,777 || 36–24
|- bgcolor="#ffbbbb"
| 61 || June 7 || Dodgers || 2–6 || De La Rosa (2–0) || Oswalt (3–4) || || 44,721 || 36–25
|- bgcolor="#bbffbb"
| 62 || June 8 || Dodgers || 2–0 || Hamels (8–2) || Kuroda (5–7) || Madson (14) || 44,751 || 37–25
|- bgcolor="#ffbbbb"
| 63 || June 9 || Cubs || 3–4 || Marshall (3–0) || Herndon (0–1) || Mármol (12) || 44,906 || 37–26
|- bgcolor="#bbffbb"
| 64 || June 10 || Cubs || 7–5 || Halladay (9–3) || Zambrano (5–3) || Bastardo (2) || 45,602 || 38–26
|- bgcolor="#bbffbb"
| 65 || June 11 || Cubs || 7–1 || Lee (6–5) || Garza (2–6) || || 45,738 || 39–26
|- bgcolor="#bbffbb"
| 66 || June 12 || Cubs || 4–3 || Oswalt (4–4) || Marshall (3–1) || Madson (15) || 45,361 || 40–26
|- bgcolor="#bbffbb"
| 67 || June 14 || Marlins || 9–1 || Hamels (9–2) || Volstad (2–7) || || 45,424 || 41–26
|- bgcolor="#bbffbb"
| 68 || June 15 || Marlins || 8–1 ||Kendrick (4–4) || Villanueva (0–1) || || 44,758 || 42–26
|- bgcolor="#bbffbb"
| 69 || June 15 || Marlins || 5–4  || Madson (3–1) || Dunn (4–5) || || 45,880 || 43–26
|- bgcolor="#bbffbb"
| 70 || June 16 || Marlins || 3–0 ||Lee (7–5) || Vasquez (3–7) || || 45,628 || 44–26
|- bgcolor="#ffbbbb"
| 71 || June 17 || @ Mariners || 2–4 || Pineda (7–4) || Oswalt (4–5) || League (20) || 34,345 || 44–27
|- bgcolor="#bbffbb"
| 72 || June 18 || @ Mariners || 5–1 || Stutes (1–0) || Hernández (7–6) || || 35,829 || 45–27
|- bgcolor="#ffbbbb"
| 73 || June 19 || @ Mariners || 0–2 || Vargas (5–4) || Hamels (9–3) || || 45,462 || 45–28
|- bgcolor="#bbffbb"
| 74 || June 21 || @ Cardinals || 10–2 || Stutes (2–0) || Miller (0–1) || || 40,095 || 46–28
|- bgcolor="#bbffbb"
| 75 || June 22 || @ Cardinals || 4–0 || Lee (8–5) || Lohse (7–4) || || 36,520 || 47–28
|- bgcolor="#ffbbbb"
| 76 || June 23 || @ Cardinals || 2–12 || Carpenter (2–7) || Oswalt (4–6) || || 40,532 || 47–29
|- bgcolor="#bbffbb"
| 77 || June 24 || Athletics || 1–0 || Stutes (3–0) || Fuentes (1–8) || || 45,685 || 48–29
|- bgcolor="#ffbbbb"
| 78 || June 25 || Athletics || 1–4 || Cahill (8–5) || Hamels (9–4) || Bailey (5) || 45,785 || 48–30
|- bgcolor="#bbffbb"
| 79 || June 26 || Athletics || 3–1 || Halladay (10–3) || Outman (3–2) || || 45,863 || 49–30
|- bgcolor="#bbffbb"
| 80 || June 28 || Red Sox || 5–0 || Lee (9–5) || Beckett (6–3) || || 45,714 || 50–30
|- bgcolor="#bbffbb"
| 81 || June 29 || Red Sox || 2–1 || Worley (3–1) || Lackey (5–7) || Bastardo (3) || 45,612 || 51–30
|- bgcolor="#ffbbbb"
| 82 || June 30 || Red Sox || 2–5 || Lester (10–4) || Herndon (0–2) || Papelbon (15) || 45,810 || 51–31

|- bgcolor="#bbffbb"
| 83 || July 1 || @ Blue Jays || 7–6 || Báez (2–3) || Francisco (1–4) || Bastardo (4) || 45,512 || 52–31
|- bgcolor="#bbffbb"
| 84 || July 2 || @ Blue Jays || 5–3 || Halladay (11–3) || Pérez (1–1) ||  || 44,078 || 53–31
|- bgcolor="#ffbbbb"
| 85 || July 3 || @ Blue Jays || 4–7 || Dotel (2–1) || Lee (9–6) ||  || 26,204 || 53–32
|- bgcolor="#bbffbb"
| 86 || July 4 || @ Marlins || 1–0 || Worley (4–1) || Nolasco (5–5) || Bastardo (5) || 27,103 || 54–32
|- bgcolor="#bbffbb"
| 87 || July 5 || @ Marlins ||  14–2 || Hamels (10–4) || Volstad (4–8) ||  || 17,333 || 55–32
|- bgcolor="#ffbbbb"
| 88 || July 6 || @ Marlins || 6–7  || Mujica (6–2) || Báez (2–4) ||  || 16,123 || 55–33
|- bgcolor="#bbffbb"
| 89 || July 8 || Braves || 3–2  || Pérez (1–0) || Proctor (1–3) ||  || 45,403 || 56–33
|- bgcolor="#ffbbbb"
| 90 || July 9 || Braves || 1–4  || Sherrill (2–1) || Stutes (3–1) || Kimbrel (28) || 45,637 || 56–34
|- bgcolor="#bbffbb"
| 91 || July 10 || Braves || 14–1 || Hamels (11–4) || Lowe (5–7) || || 45,853 || 57–34
|- align="center"
|colspan=9 bgcolor="#bbcaff"|All-Star Break
|- bgcolor="#bbffbb"
| 92 || July 15 || @ Mets || 7–2 || Worley (5–1) || Dickey (4–8) || || 37,304 || 58–34
|- bgcolor="#ffbbbb"
| 93 || July 16 || @ Mets || 2–11 || Niese (9–7) || Hamels (11–5) || || 41,166 || 58–35
|- bgcolor="#bbffbb"
| 94 || July 17 || @ Mets || 8–5 || Kendrick (5–4) || Pelfrey (5–9) || Bastardo (6) || 34,695 || 59–35
|- bgcolor="#ffbbbb"
| 95 || July 18 || @ Cubs || 1–6 || López (2–2) || Halladay (11–4) || || 38,183 || 59–36
|- bgcolor="#bbffbb" 
| 96 || July 19 || @ Cubs || 4–2 || Stutes (4–1) || Marshall (5–4) || Bastardo (7) || 38,857 || 60–36
|- bgcolor="#bbffbb"
| 97 || July 20 || @ Cubs || 9–1 || Worley (6–1) || Dempster (7–7)|| || 37,864 || 61–36
|- bgcolor="#bbffbb"
| 98 || July 22 || Padres || 3–1 || Hamels (12–5) || Luebke (3–4) || Madson (16) || 45,383 || 62–36
|- bgcolor="#bbffbb"
| 99 || July 23 || Padres || 8–6 || Stutes (5–1) || Qualls (4–5) || Madson (17) || 45,072 || 63–36
|- bgcolor="#bbffbb"
| 100 || July 24 || Padres || 4–2 || Halladay (12–4) || Stauffer (6–7) || Bastardo (8) || 45,241 || 64–36
|- bgcolor="#ffbbbb"
| 101 || July 25 || Padres || 4–5 || Harang (9–2) || Lee (9–7) || Bell (29) || 45,640 || 64–37
|- bgcolor="#bbffbb"
| 102 || July 26 || Giants || 7–2 || Worley (7–1) || Zito (3–3) || || 45,740 || 65–37
|- bgcolor="#ffbbbb"
| 103 || July 27 || Giants || 1–2 || Cain (9–6) || Hamels (12–6) || Wilson (32) || 45,800 || 65–38
|- bgcolor="#ffbbbb"
| 104 || July 28 || Giants || 1–4 || Lincecum (9–8) || Kendrick (5–5) || Wilson (33) || 45,646 || 65–39
|- bgcolor="#bbffbb"
| 105 || July 29 || Pirates || 10–3 || Halladay (13–4) || Morton (8–6) || ||45,599 || 66–39
|- bgcolor="#bbffbb"
| 106 || July 30 || Pirates || 7–4 || Lee (10–7) || McDonald (7–5) || Madson (18) || 45,737 || 67–39
|- bgcolor="#bbffbb"
| 107 || July 31 || Pirates || 6–5  || Bastardo (4–0) || Watson (0–2) || || 45,809 || 68–39

|- bgcolor="#bbffbb"
| 108 || August 1 || @ Rockies || 4–3  || Bastardo (5–0) || Brothers (1–2) || Madson (19) || 39,330 || 69–39
|- bgcolor="#bbffbb"
| 109 || August 2 || @ Rockies || 5–0 || Kendrick (6–5) || Cook (2–6) || || 39,128 || 70–39
|- bgcolor="#bbffbb"
| 110 || August 3 || @ Rockies || 8–6 || Halladay (14–4) || Hammel (6–11) || Lidge (1) || 39,404 || 71–39
|- bgcolor="#bbffbb"
| 111 || August 4 || @ Giants || 3–0 || Lee (11–7) || Bumgarner (6–11) ||  || 42,013 || 72–39
|- bgcolor="#bbffbb"
| 112 || August 5 || @ Giants || 9–2 ||Worley (8–1) ||  Sánchez (4–6) || || 42,165 || 73–39
|- bgcolor="#bbffbb"
| 113 || August 6 || @ Giants || 2–1 ||Hamels (13–6) || Cain (9–8) || || 42,183 || 74–39
|- bgcolor="#ffbbbb"
| 114 || August 7 || @ Giants || 1–3 || Lincecum (10–9) || Oswalt (4–7) || Wilson (34) || 42,366 || 74–40
|- bgcolor="#bbffbb"
| 115 || August 8 || @ Dodgers || 5–3 || Halladay (15–4) || Kuroda (7–14) || Madson (20) || 35,380 ||75–40
|- bgcolor="#bbffbb"
| 116 || August 9 || @ Dodgers || 2–1 || Lee (12–7) || Lilly (7–12) || Madson (21) || 46,547 || 76–40
|- bgcolor="#bbffbb"
| 117 || August 10 || @ Dodgers || 9–8 || Kendrick (7–5) || Hawksworth (2–3) || Madson (22) || 41,807 || 77–40
|- bgcolor="#ffbbbb"
| 118 || August 12 || Nationals || 2–4 || Hernández (7–11) || Hamels (13–7) || Storen (31) || 45,762 || 77–41
|- bgcolor="#bbffbb"
| 119 || August 13 || Nationals || 11–3 || Oswalt (5–7) || Lannan (8–8) || || 45,570 || 78–41
|- bgcolor="#bbbbbb"
|  || August 14 || Nationals ||  colspan=6| Postponed (rain); 
|- bgcolor="#ffbbbb"
| 120 || August 16 || Diamondbacks || 2–3 || Shaw (1–0) || Halladay (15–5) || Putz (30) || 45,742 ||78–42
|- bgcolor="#bbffbb"
| 121 || August 17 || Diamondbacks || 9–2 || Lee (13–7) || Saunders (8–10) || || 45,894 || 79–42
|- bgcolor="#bbffbb"
| 122 || August 18 || Diamondbacks || 4–1 || Herndon (1–2) || Kennedy (15–4) || Madson (23) || 45,633 || 80–42
|- bgcolor="#ffbbbb"
| 123 || August 19 || @ Nationals || 4–8 || Coffey (4–1) || Madson (3–2) || || 37,841 || 80–43
|- bgcolor="#bbffbb"
| 124 || August 20 || @ Nationals || 5–0 || Oswalt (6–7) || Lannan (8–9) ||  || 44,685|| 81–43
|- bgcolor="#ffbbbb"
| 125 || August 21 || @ Nationals || 4–5  || Burnett (4–5) || Lidge (0–1) || || 41,727 || 81–44
|- bgcolor="#bbffbb"
| 126 || August 22 || Mets || 10–0 || Lee (14–7) || Gee (11–5) || || 45,783 || 82–44
|- bgcolor="#bbffbb" 
| 127 || August 23 || Mets || 9–4 || Worley (9–1) || Niese (11–11) || || 45,770 || 83–44
|- bgcolor="#ffbbbb"
| 128 || August 24 || Mets || 4–7 || Pelfrey (7–10) || Kendrick (7–6) || Parnell (1) || 45,689 || 83–45
|- bgcolor="#ffbbbb"
| 129 || August 26 || Marlins || 5–6 || Hensley (2–5) || Oswalt (6–8) || Cishek (3) || 45,523 || 83–46
|- bgcolor="#bbbbbb"
| || August 27 || Marlins ||colspan=6| Postponed (Hurricane Irene); 
|- bgcolor="#bbbbbb"
| || August 28 || Marlins ||colspan=6| Postponed (Hurricane Irene); 
|- bgcolor="#bbffbb"
| 130 || August 29 || @ Reds || 3–2 || Bastardo (6–0) || Bailey (7–6) || Madson (24) || 21,360 || 84–46
|- bgcolor="#bbffbb"
| 131 || August 30 || @ Reds || 9–0 || Halladay (16–5) || Arroyo (8–11) || || 19,317 || 85–46
|- bgcolor="#bbffbb"
| 132 || August 31 || @ Reds || 3–0 || Lee (15–7) || Willis (0–4) || Madson (25) || 18,567 || 86–46

|- bgcolor= "#bbffbb"
| 133 || September 1 || @ Reds || 6–4 || Worley (10–1) || Leake (11–9) || Madson (26) ||21,438 || 87–46
|- bgcolor= "#bbffbb"
| 134 || September 2 || @ Marlins || 5–3 || Oswalt (7–8) || Hand (1–5) || Madson (27) || 21,659 || 88–46
|- bgcolor= "#ffbbbb"
| 135 || September 3 || @ Marlins || 4–8 || Mujica (9–5) || Bastardo (6–1) || || 25,333 || 88–47
|- bgcolor= "#ffbbbb"
| 136 || September 4 || @ Marlins || 4–5  || Hensley (3–6) || Herndon (1–3) || || 21,234 || 88–48
|- bgcolor= "#bbffbb"
| 137 || September 5 || Braves || 9–0 || Lee (16–7) || Lowe (9–13) || || 45,267 || 89–48
|- bgcolor= "#bbffbb"
| 138 || September 6 || Braves || 6–3 || Worley (11–1) || Hudson (14–9) || Madson (28) || 44,781 || 90–48
|- bgcolor= "#bbffbb"
| 139 || September 7 || Braves || 3–2 || Madson (4–2) || Moylan (1–1) || || 44,870 || 91–48
|- bgcolor= "#bbffbb"
| 140 || September 8 || @ Brewers || 7–2 || Hamels (14–7) || Narveson (10–7) || || 41,646 || 92–48
|- bgcolor= "#bbffbb"
| 141 || September 9 || @ Brewers || 5–3 || Halladay (17–5) || Marcum (12–6) || Madson (29) || 43,283 || 93–48
|- bgcolor= "#bbffbb"
| 142 || September 10 || @ Brewers || 3–2  || Stutes (6–1) || Hawkins (1–1) || Madson (30) || 42,967 || 94–48
|- bgcolor= "#ffbbbb"
| 143 || September 11 || @ Brewers || 2–3 || Gallardo (16–10) || Worley (11–2) || Axford (42) || 42,388 || 94–49
|- bgcolor= "#ffbbbb"
| 144 || September 12 || @ Astros || 1–5 || Myers (5–13) || Oswalt (7–9) || || 22,231 || 94–50
|- bgcolor= "#ffbbbb"
| 145 || September 13 || @ Astros || 2–5 || Happ (6–15) || Hamels (14–8) || || 24,302 || 94–51
|- bgcolor= "#bbffbb"
| 146 || September 14 || @ Astros || 1–0 || Halladay (18–5) || Norris (6–10) || || 20,027 || 95–51
|- bgcolor= "#bbffbb"
| 147 || September 15 || Marlins || 3–1 || Kendrick (8–6) || Sánchez (8–8) || Madson (31) || 44,216 || 96–51
|- bgcolor= "#bbffbb"
| 148 || September 15 || Marlins || 2–1  || Schwimer (1–0) || Badenhop (2–2) || || 44,950 || 97–51
|- bgcolor="#ffbbbb"
| 149 || September 16 || Cardinals || 2–4  || McClellan (12–6) || Schwimer (1–1) || Salas (24) || 45,572 || 97–52
|- bgcolor="#bbffbb"
| 150 || September 17 || Cardinals || 9–2 || Oswalt (8–9) || Westbrook (12–9) || || 45,470 || 98–52
|- bgcolor="#ffbbbb"
| 151 || September 18 || Cardinals || 0–5 || Carpenter (10–9) || Hamels (14–9) || || 45,063 || 98–53
|- bgcolor="#ffbbbb"
| 152 || September 19 || Cardinals || 3–4 || Lohse (14–8) || Halladay (18–6) || Dotel (3) || 45,048 || 98–54
|- bgcolor="#ffbbbb"
| 153 || September 20 || Nationals || 3–4  || Gorzelanny (4–6) || Stutes (6–2) || Storen (39) || 44,263 || 98–55
|- bgcolor="#ffbbbb"
| 154 || September 20 || Nationals || 0–3 || Detwiler (3–5) || Lee (16–8) || Storen (40) || 45,408 || 98–56
|- bgcolor="#ffbbbb"
| 155 || September 21 || Nationals || 5–7 || Lannan (10–13) || Worley (11–3) || Rodríguez (1) || 45,083 || 98–57
|- bgcolor="#ffbbbb"
| 156 || September 22 || Nationals || 1–6 || Peacock (2–0) || Oswalt (8–10) || || 45,064 || 98–58
|- bgcolor="#bbbbbb"
| 157 || September 23 || @ Mets ||colspan=6| Postponed (rain); 
|- bgcolor="#ffbbbb"
| 157 || September 24 || @ Mets || 1–2 || Parnell (4–6) || Lidge (0–2) || Acosta (3) || 33,961 || 98–59
|- bgcolor="#ffbbbb"
| 158 || September 24 || @ Mets || 3–6 || Gee (13–6) || Herndon (1–4) || Acosta (4) || 32,437 || 98–60
|- bgcolor="#bbffbb"
| 159 || September 25 || @ Mets || 9–4 || Halladay (19–6) || Pelfrey (7–13) || || 32,796 || 99–60
|- bgcolor="#bbffbb"
| 160 || September 26 || @ Braves || 4–2 || Lee (17–8) || Martínez (1–3) || Madson (32) || 42,597 || 100–60
|- bgcolor="#bbffbb"
| 161 || September 27 || @ Braves || 7–1 || Oswalt (9–10) || Lowe (9–17) || || 38,663 || 101–60
|- bgcolor="#bbffbb"
| 162 || September 28 || @ Braves || 4–3  || De Fratus(1–0) || Linebrink (4–4) || Herndon (1) || 45,350 || 102–60

|-
|  Source:

Postseason Game Log

|- style="background:#bfb;"
| 1 || October 1 || Cardinals || 11–6 || Roy Halladay (1–0) || Kyle Lohse (0–1) || — || || 1–0
|- style="background:#fbb;"
| 2 || October 2 || Cardinals || 4–5 || Octavio Dotel (1–0) || Cliff Lee (0–1) || Jason Motte (1) || || 1–1
|- style="background:#bfb;"
| 3 || October 4 || @ Cardinals || 3–2 || Cole Hamels (1–0) || Jaime Garcia (0–1) || Ryan Madson (1) || || 2–1
|- style="background:#fbb;"
| 4 || October 5 || @ Cardinals || 3–5 || Edwin Jackson (1–0) || Roy Oswalt (0–1) || Jason Motte (2) || || 2–2
|- style="background:#fbb;"
| 5 || October 7 || Cardinals || 0–1 || Chris Carpenter (1–0) || Roy Halladay (1–1) || — || || 2–3
|-

Roster
All players who made an appearance for the Phillies during 2011 are included.

2011 N.L. Division Series vs. St. Louis Cardinals

The Phillies finished out the season with a sweep of the Atlanta Braves, and in doing so, allowed the St. Louis Cardinals to clinch the National League wild-card on the last day of the regular season. Having finished with the best record for the second year in a row, the Phillies had home-field advantage for the series. Game 1 saw the Cardinals jump out to an early lead, with a three-run homer by Lance Berkman in the top of the 1st, off Phillies ace Roy Halladay. The Phillies bats woke up in the 6th inning, with home runs by Ryan Howard and Raúl Ibañez. In addition to the offense waking up, Halladay tamed the Cardinals, retiring 21 straight batters, and the Phillies took game 1, 11–6. Game 2 featured another Philadelphia ace, Cliff Lee, facing the Cardinals' Chris Carpenter, who would make his first start on three days rest of his career. The Phillies jumped out to a 4-run lead, however, Cliff Lee surrendered 5 runs, as the Cardinals came back, and took game 2, 5–4. The series then went to Busch Stadium in St. Louis for games 3 and 4. Game 3 featured Cole Hamels taking on Jaime García, both of whom pitched a scoreless game through 6 innings. In the 7th inning, the Phillies' pinch-hitter Ben Francisco fired a three-run homer to give the Phillies the lead. The Cardinals were able to fight back and get 2 runs, but Ryan Madson shut the door, with a 5-out save, to give the Phillies a 2–1 series lead. In Game 4, a matchup between Roy Oswalt and Edwin Jackson, the Phillies again jumped out to an early 2-run lead. The Cardinals cut the lead in half in the bottom of the first. David Freese was the hero of game 4, with a two-run double in the fourth, which gave the Cardinals the lead, and a two-run homer in the sixth. The Phillies were not able to come back, and that sent the series back to Philadelphia tied at two games. Game 5 featured a marquee pitching matchup, with former Toronto teammates, Roy Halladay and Chris Carpenter facing off. Again, the Cardinals took an early lead, with Rafael Furcal scoring off a Skip Schumaker double. It turned out that was all the Cardinals needed, as they went on to win, 1–0. For the Cardinals, it added to their thus-far improbable season, and advanced to the NLCS for the first time since winning the 2006 World Series. First baseman Ryan Howard suffered a torn Achilles tendon, that would forced him to miss some time for the 2012 season.

Awards
Vance Worley was named by Baseball America as one of the five starting pitchers on its All-Rookie Team.

Roy Halladay was named the Sportsperson of the Year by the Philadelphia Daily News for the second consecutive year.

The Philadelphia chapter of the Baseball Writers' Association of America (BBWAA) presented its annual franchise awards to Shane Victorino ("Mike Schmidt Most Valuable Player Award"), Cliff Lee ("Steve Carlton Most Valuable Pitcher Award"), Charlie Manuel ("Dallas Green Special Achievement Award"), and Raúl Ibañez ("Tug McGraw Good Guy Award").

Jimmy Rollins (shortstop) and Roy Halladay (one of three starting pitchers) were named to the MLB Insiders Club Magazine All-Postseason Team.

Shane Victorino received the Branch Rickey Award for his exceptional community service.

Retired general manager Pat Gillick was inducted into the National Baseball Hall of Fame.

Farm system

References

Further reading

External links
2011 Philadelphia Phillies season at Baseball Reference
Philadelphia Phillies' official website

Philadelphia Phillies seasons
Philadelphia Phillies
National League East champion seasons
Philadelphia Phillies